Vlado Goreski – Rafik (Macedonian: Владо Ѓорески – Рафик) (born 21 April 1958, in Bitola) is a Macedonian and Slovenian graphic artist, artist, scenographer. He finished secondary school in Bitola, and he graduated at the Faculty of Philosophy – Skopje, Department History of Art at 1981. He has studied at the International Centre of Graphic Arts in Ljubljana, Slovenia.

In 1980 he began to volunteer, and in 1981 he was employed as painter-artist at the National Theatre Bitola. In 1982 he was employed in Institute, Museum and Gallery in Bitola as curator of contemporary art.

He had his first solo exhibition in 1981, and since then he is permanently present with solo and collective exhibitions in the country and abroad. On the field of art critics he is present primarily in the graphics art, but he does not neglect the other art parts. 
His artistic affirmation turns internationally as well, as jury member, selector and expert consultant:

He is member of the international jury of the Graphic Biennial in Varna, Bulgaria.
He was member of the International Jury of Gallery of World Drawing in Skopje, North Macedonia.

He was selector of authors, representatives of the country of North Macedonia, and presenter of the collection of the International Graphic Triennial – Bitola at the Graphic Triennial in Chamalières, France. In addition, he presents artists from other countries at this triennial.

He was expert consultant and participated in organizing the 2nd International Graphic Biennial, Čačak, Serbia, 2014 – 2020

Work 
Vlado Goreski is Art Director of International Triennial of Graphic Art in Bitola, North Macedonia, and he is employed as curator of contemporary arts at the national Institute, Museum and Gallery Bitola.

Painting

Gallery 

From 2016 to 2020 he participated in over a hundred art exhibitions in many countries around the world:

Slovenia,

Croatia,

France,

England,

Italy,

Mexico,

Poland – Graphic triennial Krakow, Biennial of miniature graphics in Lodz,

Russia,

Japan,

Moldova,

Hungary,

Australia,

Turkey,

Brazil,

Argentina,

Serbia,

Armenia,

Romania...

As painter and graphic artist he had solo exhibitions and he participated at many collective exhibitions in the country and abroad.
 2nd International Exhibition "SMALL FORM OF GRAPHIC 13x18 – Dialogue workshop with the number", 2014/2015, Końskich, Radomiu, Kielcah, Busku-Zbroju, Poland 
 Osten museum of drawing – Vlado Goreski-Rafik
 Museo de la grafica, Pisa, Italy, et Paolo Ciampini (Pisa, Museo de la grafica, Italy, et Paolo Ciampini)
 9 Trienniale Mondiale de petit format Chamаlières, France, 2014
 Tribuna Graphic, 2014, Museum of Art Cluj
 Fire, water, earth, 2014, Shumen, Bulgaria 
 Fire, water, earth, 2013, Gourin, France
 7th International Triennial of Graphic Art Bitola, 2012
 International art projects, 2012, Shumen, Bulgaria
 6th International Triennial of Graphic Art Bitola, 2009
 World gallery of drawings – Osten, 2009
 4th International Triennial of Graphic Art Bitola, 2003 (group Sibelius)
 2nd International Biennial of Small Graphic, 2003, Tetovo (group Sibelius)
 Solo exhibition, Prilep, 2002, 37th MTF "Vojdan Chernodrinski"
 Solo exhibition, Skopje, 2001, Young Open Theatre
 La Bellone, Bruxelles, 2000
 Grafikusmuveszek, Debrecen, Hungary, 2000
 Print Biennial, Seul, 2000, 12
 3rd International Triennial of Graphic Art Bitola, 2000 (group Sibelius)
 3rd International Triennial of Graphic Art Bitola, 2000 (Vlado – Angels’ mass)
 Balkan exhibition of graphic, Subotica and Novi Sad, Serbia, 1999
 Norwegian international print triennale, Fredrikstad, 1997
 Solo exhibition, Bitola, 1981

Scenography

Gallery 

Vlado Goreski is present on the theatre stage for many years and had many awards and positive critics for his scenographies.

His scenographies are present in many theatres in the country and abroad.

Drama Theatre in Skopje 
 Hamlet (1997 and 2012) 
 Jona Dab 
 All faces of Petre Andreevski 
 Archelaos or Euripide comes back home

Theatre of Turkey, Skopje
 Romeo and Juliet 
 Gilgamesh 
 Tartuffe 
 I am Orhan too

Macedonian National Theatre
 Delirium for Two 
 The life is dream

National Theatre Strumica
 Dossier Strindberg 
 The last day of Misirkov

National Theatre Prilep
 Roberto Zucco 
 Colonel bird
 Wife for the colonel 
 Lighthouse 
 Poor life

National Theatre Bitola
 The brothers Karamazov 
 The Master and Margarita 
 Underground republic
 Refugee
 The house of Bernarda Alba
 Notre femme de Paris

Rodopa Drama Theatre, Smolyan
 FTM to the one who started first (F... the mother to the one who started first)
City Theatre "Marin Drzic", Dubrovnik, Croatia
 The brothers Karamazov

Art critic 
His critic essays start from the local, artistic Bitola milieu, and through the Balkan space they broaden worldwide.
 Agatha Gertchen, Poland
 Dimitar Kochevski – Micho, Macedonia
 Djurić – Džamonja
 Leonardo Gotlieb, Argentina
 Marc Frising, Belgium
 Maurice Pasternak, Belgium
 Paolo Ciampini, Italy
 Sveto Manev, Macedonia
 Slobodan Jevtic, France
 Tatjana Maneva, Macedonia

Design of theatre posters 
Vlado Goreski is the author of many theatre posters for which he received numerous awards. He prepared the posters for the following theatre productions:
 The Master and Margarita – Bulgakov, National Theatre Bitola, 
 The threepenny Opera – Brecht, National Theatre Prilep, 
 Don Quixote – Cervantes, National Theatre Stip, 
 The Police – Mrozek, National Theatre Ohrid, 
 The brothers Karamazov – Dostoyevski, City Theatre Dubrovnik, Croatia, 
 FTM to the one who started first – Dukovski, Rodopa Drama Theatre, Smolyan, Bulgaria, etc.

Original projects 
 The Gospel according to the shadows (with Vlado Cvetanovski) – National Theatre Bitola
 I'm Orhan too – Theatre of Turkey, Skopje 
 Dossier Strindberg – National Theatre Strumica
 Adaptation of "The eighth wonder of the world" – Jordan Plevneš, National Theatre Bitola

Awards 
He has won over twenty national and international awards for art achievements:
  
 2012 – Award for the best advertising material for the performance "The Police" (Theatre Ohrid)
 2011 – Award for the best advertising material for the performance "Hamlet" (Drama theatre – Skopje)
 2010 – Award for the best advertising material for the performance "The brothers Karamazov" (National Theatre Bitola)
 2009 – Award for the best advertising material for the performance "The last day of Misirkov" (National Theatre "Anton Panov" – Strumica)
 2008 – Award for the best advertising material for the performance "Refugee" (National Theatre Stip)
 2008 – Award for the best scenography for the performance "Refugee" (National Theatre Stip)
 2007 – Award for the best advertising material for the performance "Tartuffe" (National Theatre Stip)
 2006 – Award for the best advertising material for the performance "Roberto Zucco" (National Theatre Prilep)
 2003 – Award for the best advertising material for the performance "The Lower Depths" (National Theatre Bitola)
 1998 – Award for the best scenography for the performance "Colonel bird" (National Theatre Prilep)
 1998 – Award for the best advertising material for the performance "Colonel bird" (National Theatre Prilep)
 1996 – Award for scenography for the performance "The Master and Margarita" (National Theatre Bitola)
 1994 – Award for the performance "Notre femme de Paris" (National Theatre Bitola)
 1991 – Award for scenography for the performance "Underground republic" (National Theatre Bitola)
 Award – Premium of the Biennial of Contemporary International Graphic Art, Moldova.
 Award – Premium at the International Graphic Biennale in Bucharest, Romania.

Bibliography 
 Vlado Goreski- „Nocturne" II, 2019
 Vlado Goreski – „Drypoint" II
 Vlado Goreski – „Drypoint" I
 Vlado Goreski – „Drypoint" IV – Cathedral
 Vlado Goreski – „Nocturne" I
 Vlado Goreski – „Drypoint" III
 Vlado Goreski – „Drypoint" IV
 Vlado Goreski – „Miniature graphics"
 Vlado Goreski – „Miniature graphics"
 Vlado Goreski – „Ex Libris – Ex Litera"
 Vlado Goreski – Vladimir Simonovski – „Large format graphics"

References

External links 
 Academia.edu
 for Paolo Ciampini
 Academia.edu
 GORESKI tutte le informazioni
 MAM Multimedia Art Magazine
 Akademia Sztuk Pięknych (Katowice)
 Владо Ѓорески
 Grafiche divagazioni – Grafiche divagazioni – Incisori Contemporanei
 KOLEKCJA 
 Internazionale di Grafica d’Arte
 Organizing Committee
 GORESKI tutte le informazioni
 MAM Multimedia Art Magazine
 / vladogoreski
 EXIBART
 ГРАФИЧКОТО ТРИЕНАЛЕ ВО БИТОЛА
 Графичкото триенале во Битола
 Театарот „Марин Држиќ“ од Дубровник
 Akademia Sztuk Pięknych (Katowice)
 Organizing Committee

1958 births
Living people
People from Bitola
Graphic artists
Yugoslav art critics
Scenic designers
Macedonian scenic designers
Macedonian artists
Slovenian artists
University of Ljubljana alumni
Ss. Cyril and Methodius University of Skopje alumni
20th-century Macedonian painters
21st-century Slovenian painters
21st-century male artists
20th-century Slovenian painters
20th-century Slovenian male artists
Slovenian male painters